Sir Henry Poole (1564 – 3 November 1632) was an English landowner and politician who sat in the House of Commons at various times between 1597 and 1626.

Poole was the eldest son of Edward Poole of Cirencester, Gloucestershire and Oaksey, Wiltshire. He succeeded to the estates on the death of his father in 1577.  In 1580, he attended Trinity College, Oxford. He was a J.P. for Wiltshire from about 1590 but fell into dispute with fellow JP Henry Knyvet over the ownership of the manor of Kemble, a quarrel which lasted several years. 
 
In 1597, Poole was elected Member of Parliament for Cirencester. He was knighted in 1603. In 1604 he was elected MP for Cricklade. He was elected MP for Wiltshire in 1614 and was High Sheriff of Wiltshire from 1619 to 1620. In 1621 he was elected MP for Malmesbury. He was elected MP for Oxfordshire in 1624, becoming one of the few MPs to serve as Knight of the Shire for more than one county. In 1626 he was elected MP for Wiltshire again.
 
Poole died at the age of 67.

Poole married firstly Griselda Neville, daughter of Edward Nevill, 7th Baron Bergavenny, of Newton St Loe, Somerset and had two sons and a daughter. He married secondly Anne Lady Harington (née Barnard) widow of Sir James Harington of Ridlington, Rutland. His son Neville was also a Member of Parliament.

References

 
 
 
 

1564 births
1632 deaths
English landowners
Alumni of Trinity College, Oxford
High Sheriffs of Wiltshire
People from Cirencester
Members of the Parliament of England for Malmesbury
English MPs 1597–1598
English MPs 1604–1611
English MPs 1614
English MPs 1624–1625
English MPs 1626
Members of the Parliament of England (pre-1707) for Cricklade
Members of the Parliament of England (pre-1707) for Wiltshire